José Vicente Rangel Vale (10 July 1929 – 18 December 2020) was a Venezuelan politician and journalist. He ran for president three times in the 1970s and 1980s and later supported Hugo Chávez. He served under Chávez as Minister of Foreign Affairs from 1999 to 2001, as Minister of Defense from 2001 to 2002, and as the vice president from 2002 to 2007.

Political activism

Born in Caracas, he returned to Venezuela following the downfall of the dictatorship of Marcos Pérez Jiménez in 1958 and was elected to the Congress that same year, representing the Democratic Republican Union (Unión Republicana Democrática, URD). In addition to his political activities, he worked as a lawyer and journalist. He also made presidential bids on three occasions: in the 1973 presidential election and 1978 presidential election as candidate of MAS – Movimiento al Socialismo (Movement for Socialism), and in the 1983 presidential election as candidate of MEP – Movimiento Electoral del Pueblo.

Journalist
In 1990, Rangel re-entered journalism, contributing to a range of newspapers as a columnist (including El Universal, Panorama, El Informador, La Tarde, El Regional, 2001). In the 1960s he was editor of the weekly Qué Pasa en Venezuela (1960–67) and of the dailies La Razón and Clarín.

Rangel played a role in the 1993 impeachment of President Carlos Andrés Pérez, being the first to publish (in November 1992) the corruption allegations which would ultimately be endorsed by the Supreme Court. On 20 May 1993, the Supreme Court considered the accusation valid, and the National Congress removed Pérez from office. He was imprisoned and sentenced to two years of prison on May, 1994 for malversation of funds of the so-called secret fund. For many years he has held a political opinion show on Televen called "José Vicente Hoy".

Political career
Hugo Chávez chose Rangel to serve as his Minister of Foreign Affairs when he took office as president in February 1999. Rangel served in that position until early February 2001, when Chávez instead appointed him as Minister of Defence, replacing General Ismael Hurtado. Rangel was the first civilian to serve as Defense Minister in decades.

After a little more than a year as Minister of Defense, Rangel became vice-president in May 2002, replacing Diosdado Cabello. On 3 January 2007, Chávez announced that Rangel would be replaced as vice president by Jorge Rodríguez. Chávez said that the decision was "not easy", and that he regarded Rangel "with the same respect and affection as a son would a father", but did not explain the reasoning behind the decision. At the swearing in ceremony for the new cabinet on 8 January, Rangel said that he was leaving the government, but not the revolution. He and Rodríguez exchanged praise, with the latter saying that Rangel was the first person he had ever voted for, in the 1983 election.

Personal life and death
Rangel was the author of Expediente Negro, an investigation of human rights violations in Venezuela in the 1960s and 1970s. His son, José Vicente Rangel Ávalos, has also been involved in Venezuelan politics, having been mayor of the Sucre District in Caracas. Rangel died of cardiac arrest on 18 December 2020. He was 91 years old.

Books
 Expediente Negro, Caracas: Editorial Fuentes, 1972
 Tiempo de Verdades, Caracas: Ediciones Centauro, 1973 – a selection of Rangel's press contributions
 Rangel et al., Militares y política (una polėmica inconclusa), Caracas: Ediciones Centauro, 1976
 Seguridad, defensa, democracia: Un tema para cíviles y militares, Caracas: Ediciones Centauro, 1980
 Socialismo y Democracia
 La Administración de Justicia en Venezuela

See also 

Vice President of Venezuela
List of Ministers of Foreign Affairs of Venezuela

References

1929 births
2020 deaths
Politicians from Caracas
Vice presidents of Venezuela
Venezuelan Ministers of Defense
Venezuelan Ministers of Foreign Affairs
Members of the Venezuelan Chamber of Deputies
Venezuelan journalists
20th-century Venezuelan lawyers
Democratic Republican Union politicians
Movement for Socialism (Venezuela) politicians
Members of the Venezuelan Constituent Assembly of 1999